R. Raghuraman was an Indian civil servant and administrator. He was the administrator of Mahe from  12 November 1975 to 30 June 1977.

References 

 

Year of birth missing
Possibly living people
Administrators of Mahe